Ban Thieng is a river village in Vientiane Province, Laos. It is located to the northwest of Vang Vieng off Route 13.

References

Populated places in Vientiane Province